is a Japanese scriptwriter, novelist and manga author. He is best known for the Saber Marionette, Sakura Wars and Sorcerer Hunters series, which comes in anime, novel and  manga forms.

Works
Akahori Gedou Hour Rabuge: Series Composition, Script (episodes 1–2, 7, 12–13), Original creator
Combustible Campus Guardress (with Kazushi Hagiwara): Series Composition, Screenplay, Original creator
Kami to Sengoku Seitokai (manga with Ryosuke Takada)
Kashimashi: Girl Meets Girl (with Yukimaru Katsura)
Lime-iro Senkitan: Scenario, Script (episodes 1, 3, 5–6, 8, 11, 13), Original creator
Magical Shopping Arcade Abenobashi: Series Composition, Script (episodes 2–3, 5, 11), Novel Serialization (Kadokawa Shoten The Sneaker)
Master of Mosquiton (manga version with Hiroshi Negishi)
Maze: Bakunetsu Jikuu (manga version with Rei Omishi)
Mon Colle Knights: Script, Original creator
Mouse (with Hiroshi Itaba)
NG Knight Ramune & 40
Saber Marionette J
Sakura Wars (manga version with Oji Hiroi)
Sorcerer Hunters (manga version with Rei Omishi)
Sorcerer on the Rocks
Tekkaman Blade: Series Composition, Screenplay (episodes 2, 15–16, 28, 48)
Video Girl Ai: Script (episodes 1, 5), Series construction
Cyber Team in Akihabara
Kyatto Ninden Teyandee/Samurai Pizza Cats
Martian Successor Nadesico
Legend of Heavenly Sphere Shurato

External links 
 i-POLILIN, Akahori's website (Japanese)
 Hitoshi Doi's Saber Marionette info page
 Hanami's Saber Marionette World
 
 

 
1965 births
Artists from Aichi Prefecture
Japanese writers
Light novelists
Living people
People from Handa, Aichi
Writers from Aichi Prefecture